Trtovac is a surname. Notable people with the surname include:

Selman Trtovac (born 1970), Serbian artist
Jasmin Trtovac (born 1986), Serbian footballer